Helgadóttir is an Icelandic matronymic, literally meaning "daughter of Helgi". Notable people with the name include:

Ásthildur Helgadóttir (born 1976), Icelandic footballer
Gerður Helgadóttir (1928–1975), Icelandic sculptor and artist
Guðrún Helgadóttir (born 1935), Icelandic writer
Guðrún P. Helgadóttir (1922–2005), Icelandic writer, poet, scholar and educator
Heiða Kristín Helgadóttir (born 1983), Icelandic politician and entrepreneur
Helga Vala Helgadóttir  (born 1972), Icelandic politician
Ragnhildur Helgadóttir (1930–2016), Icelandic politician
Þóra Björg Helgadóttir (born 1981), Icelandic footballer

Icelandic-language surnames